Gloucester 4 was an English rugby union league which sat at the twelve level of league rugby union in England for teams based in Gloucestershire and parts of Bristol.  Promoted clubs moved into Gloucester 3 and there was no relegation as this was the basement league for club rugby union in Gloucestershire.  In 1996 after ten seasons Gloucester 4 was discontinued at the end of the 1995-96 campaign.

Original teams
When league rugby began in 1987 this division (then known as Gloucestershire 4) contained the following teams:

Aretians
Bristol Telephone Area
Bristol Aeroplane Company
Broad Plain
Gloucester All Blues
Hucclecote Old Boys
Minchinhampton
Newent
Old Colstonians
Old Elizabethans
Smiths

Gloucester 4 honours

Gloucestershire 4 (1987–1989)

Originally a single division known as Gloucestershire 4, it was a tier 12 league.  Promotion was to Gloucestershire 3 and there was no relegation.

Gloucestershire 4A / 4B (1989–1991)

For the 1989–90 season Gloucestershitre 4 split into two tier 12 divisions - Gloucestershire 4A and Gloucestershire 4B.  Promotion continued to Gloucestershire 3 and there was no relegation.

Gloucestershire 4 (1990–1991)

After a single season Gloucester 4 reverted to being a single division at tier 12 of the league system.  Promotion continued to Gloucestershire 3 and there was no relegation.

Gloucester 4 (1991–1993)

Gloucestershire 4 was shorted to Gloucester 4 for the 1991–92 season onward.  It remained a tier 12 league with promotion to Gloucester 3 and there was no relegation.

Gloucester 4 (1993–1996)

The creation of National League 5 South for the 1993–94 season meant that Gloucester 4 dropped to become a tier 13 league.  Promotion continued to Gloucester 3 and there was no relegation.  At the end of the 1995–96 Gloucester 4 was disbanded with the majority of teams promoted up into Gloucester 3.

Number of league titles

Smiths (2)
Bishopston (1)
Bristol Telephone Area (1)
Gloucestershire Police (1)
Minchinhampton (1)
Old Richians (1)
Stow-on-the-Wold (1)
Tetbury (1)
Tewkesbury (1)

See also
 Gloucestershire RFU
 English rugby union system
 Rugby union in England

Notes

References

Defunct rugby union leagues in England
Rugby union in Gloucestershire